Lộc An may refer to the following places in Vietnam:
 Lộc An, Bà Rịa–Vũng Tàu, a commune in Đất Đỏ District, Bà Rịa–Vũng Tàu Province
 Lộc An, Lâm Đồng, a commune in Bảo Lâm District, Lâm Đồng Province
 Lộc An, Thừa Thiên-Huế, a commune in Phú Lộc District, Thừa Thiên–Huế Province
 Lộc An, Đồng Nai, a commune in Long Thành District, Đồng Nai Province
 Lộc An, Bình Phước, a commune in Lộc Ninh District, Bình Phước Province
 Lộc An, Nam Định, a commune in Nam Định city, Nam Định Province

See also 
 An Lộc (disambiguation)